The Regensburger Domspatzen (literally: Regensburg Cathedral Sparrows) is the cathedral choir at the Regensburg Cathedral in Regensburg, Bavaria, Germany. The boys' choir dates back to 975, and consists of boys and young men only. They perform in liturgy and concert, and have made international tours and recordings.

History and organization
The Domspatzen, literally "Cathedral Sparrows", trace their origins back to the year 975 when bishop Wolfgang of Regensburg founded a cathedral school that – among other things – instructed boys to sing in the liturgy. It is the oldest choir in the world. The boys choir has seen various ups and downs during its history of more than a thousand years. In the 20th century, however, the Domspatzen became world-famous, especially through the achievement of the two directors who were to shape them over the course of 70 years: Theobald Schrems (Domkapellmeister 1924 to 1964) and Georg Ratzinger (1964–1994).

Schrems laid the foundations that enabled the choir's success by giving the Domspatzen their current institutional makeup: a boarding school for boys aged 10–19, a private secondary school with emphasis on musical education, and the choir at the center of the structure. In this way the boys can practise singing together and learn under the same roof, which allows for greater efficiency and thus also helps to avoid exhaustion of the students. Ratzinger oversaw the choir becoming a stable concert presence and consolidated and enhanced its quality. Since 1994, Roland Büchner has been Domkapellmeister; the first layman after centuries of conductors from the clergy.

Domkapellmeister 

 1551–1568: Johann Simon
 1679–1691: 
 1769–1801: 
 1801–1834: 
 1838–1839: 
 1839–1871: 
 1871–1882: Franz Xaver Haberl
 1882–1882: 
 1882–1885: 
 1885–1891: 
 1891–1924: 
 1924–1963: Theobald Schrems
 1964–1994: Georg Ratzinger
 1994–2019: Roland Büchner
 since 2019:

Recordings and tours 
The choir has made numerous recordings (e.g. Bach's Christmas Oratorio, his motets, Psalmen Davids by Heinrich Schütz, and Handel's Messiah. It made concert tours throughout the world, including the United States, Scandinavia, Canada, Taiwan, Japan, Ireland, Poland, Hungary and the Vatican, in addition to an annual tour in Germany.

Performances
The choir performed in honor of Queen Elizabeth II on the occasion of her State Visit to Germany in 1978, and at Pope John Paul II’s visit to Munich in 1980. They also gave a concert in Bonn for the state guests at the NATO summit in 1982 under the auspices of then German president Karl Carstens. In 2006 they gave a concert in the Vatican City for Pope Benedict XVI, the brother of the former Domkapellmeister Georg Ratzinger. The main purpose of the choir, however, remains the music in the liturgy of St Peter's, where the religious services of Holy Week constitute the prime event of the liturgical, and thus also the musical year.

References

External links

 
 , "Schlafe, mein Prinzchen, schlaf ein".

German choirs
975 establishments
Boys' and men's choirs
Culture in Regensburg
Catholic Church sexual abuse scandals in Germany
10th-century establishments in Germany
Church choirs
German church music
Violence against men in Europe